Ivughli District is in Khoy County, West Azerbaijan province, Iran. At the 2006 National Census, its population was 17,915 in 4,522 households. The following census in 2011 counted 17,603 people in 5,081 households. At the latest census in 2016, the district had 16,259 inhabitants in 5,055 households.

References 

Khoy County

Districts of West Azerbaijan Province

Populated places in West Azerbaijan Province

Populated places in Khoy County